Tomas Alberio (born 31 March 1989, in Bussolengo) is an Italian former professional cyclist.

Major results
2009
1st Trofeo Edil C
1st Stage 1 (TTT) Giro della Valle d'Aosta
3rd Gran Premio di Poggiana
2010
1st Overall Tour do Rio
1st Stages 1 & 2
1st Gran Premio Industrie del Marmo
3rd Gran Premio Palio del Recioto

References

External links

1989 births
Living people
Italian male cyclists
Cyclists from the Province of Verona
21st-century Italian people